Harpalus salinus agonus is a subspecies of ground beetle native to Central Asia, where it could be found in such countries as Afghanistan, Kyrgyzstan, Tajikistan, Indian province Kashmir, and Chinese ones such as Xinjiang, Xizang and Tibet.

References

salinus agonus
Beetles of Asia
Beetles described in 1894